Mount Morris Park may refer to:
Marcus Garvey Park or Mount Morris Park
Mount Morris Park Historic District, the neighborhood surrounding Marcus Garvey Park